Ariel Porat (born November 1, 1956, in Tel Aviv, Israel) is the president of Tel Aviv University (TAU), a full professor and former dean at TAU's Buchmann Faculty of Law.  Until his appointment as president, he was a distinguished visiting professor of law at the University of Chicago Law School. He is a member of the Israel Academy of Sciences and Humanities, incumbent of the Alain Poher Chair in Private Law at TAU, and recipient of The EMET Prize for Art, Science and Culture for Legal Research.

Biography

Ariel Porat was born in Tel Aviv. His father, Haim Porat, served as VP of the District Court of Tel Aviv, and his mother, Adina Porat, was a judge at the National Labor Court. Porat served for five years in the Israel Defense Forces' Israeli Intelligence Corps and holds the rank of Major (reserve). Completing his LLB with distinction (1979-1983) at Tel Aviv University, he went on to a direct-track JSD (1989), followed by a visiting scholar position (1989–90), at Yale University.

Legal and academic career
In 1990 Porat joined TAU's Buchmann Faculty of Law. He specializes in torts, contracts and economic analysis of the law, and is the incumbent of the Alain Poher Chair in Private Law. From 2002 to 2006 he served as dean of the faculty. From 2003 until his nomination as president of TAU in 2019, Porat was Fischel-Neil Distinguished Visiting Professor at the University of Chicago Law School, with additional visiting professor positions at Stanford, NYU, Columbia University, UC Berkeley, and the University of Toronto. He is a member of the American Law Institute, former President of the Israeli Law and Economics Association, and former Board member of the American Law and Economics Association (2008–11).

Porat founded and edited (2000-2003) Theoretical Inquiries in Law, an international law journal ranked second in the world in the area of Jurisprudence and Legal Theory by Washington and Lee Law Journal Rankings.

From 1997 to 2002 he headed the Cegla Center for Interdisciplinary Research of the Law at the Buchmann Faculty of Law. In 2013 Porat was appointed head of TAU's Strategic Steering Committee, tasked with examining possible changes in the university's academic structure and management. The Committee's recommendations were adopted and implemented by TAU.

In June 2014, Porat was elected member of the Israel Academy of Sciences and Humanities. Other honors include the European Law and Economics Association Award for Lifetime Achievements in Law and Economics (2020); EMET Prize for Legal Research (2014); Zeltner Prize for Legal Research (2012); Shneor Zalman Cheshin Award for Academic Excellence in Law (2010);  and Zusman Prize for Young Scholars.

In May 2019, Porat was elected 9th President of Tel Aviv University, succeeding Joseph Klafter.

In 2020, the European Association of Law and Economics awarded Porat the prestigious EALE Award for lifetime achievement.

Published works

	Personalizing the Law (Oxford University Press, in preparation) (with O. Ben-Shahar).
	Getting Incentives Right: Torts, Contracts, and Restitution (Princeton University Press, 2013) (with R. Cooter).
	The Economics of Remedies (editor) (Edward Elgar Publishing Ltd., series eds., Richard Posner and Francesco Parisi, 2012).
	Fault in American Contract Law (Cambridge University Press, 2010, ed. with O. Ben-Shahar).
	Tort Liability under Uncertainty (Oxford University Press, 2001) (with A. Stein).
	Torts Vol. 1 (The Harry and Michael Sacher Institute for Legislative Research and Comparative Law, 2013).
	Contributory Negligence Defense in Contract Law (The Harry and Michael Sacher Institute for Legislative Research and Comparative Law, 1997).

Selected papers

	"Tort Liability and the Risk of Discriminatory Government" 87 University of Chicago Law Review (2020) (with E. Guttel)
	"Personalizing Mandatory Rules in Contract Law" 86 University of Chicago Law Review (2019) (with O. Ben-Shahar)
	"The Restoration Remedy in Private Law" 119 Columbia Law Review 1901 (2018) (with O. Ben-Shahar)
	"Can Restitution Save Fragile Spiderless Networks?" 8 Harvard Business Law Review 1 (2018) (with R.E. Scott)
	"Personalizing Negligence Law" 91 NYU Law Review 627 (2016) (with O. Ben-Shahar)
	"Offsetting Benefits" 100 Virginia Law Review 1165 (2014) (with E. Posner)
	"Personalizing Default Rules and Disclosure with Big Data" 112 Michigan Law Review 1417 (2014) (with L. Strahilevitz)
	"Asymmetries and Incentives in Plea Bargaining and Evidence Production" 122 Yale Law Journal 690 (2012) (with S. Levmore)
	"Aggregation and Law" 122 Yale Law Journal 2 (2012) (with E. Posner)
	"Misalignments in Tort Law" 121 Yale Law Journal 82 (2011)
	"Bargaining with Double Jeopardy" 40 Journal of Legal Studies 273 (2011) (with S. Levmore)
	"Willingness to Pay, Death, Wealth, and Damages" 13 American Law and Economics Review 45 (2011) (with A. Tabbach)
	"Private Production of Public Goods: Liability for Unrequested Benefits" 108 Michigan Law Review 189 (2009)
	"Criminal Responsibility for Unspecified Offenses" 94 Minnesota Law Review 261 (2009) (with A. Harel)
	"Offsetting Risks" 106 Michigan Law Review 243 (2007).
	"Total Liability for Excessive Harm" 36 Journal of Legal Studies 63 (2007) (with R. Cooter).
	"Promoting Consensus in Society Through Deferred-Implementation Agreements" 56 University of Toronto L.J. 151 (2006) (with O. Yadlin).
	"Decreasing Liability Contracts" 33 Journal of Legal Studies 157 (2004) (with R. Cooter).
	"Anti-Insurance" 31 Journal of Legal Studies 203 (2002) (with R. Cooter).
	"Should Court Deduct Non-Legal Sanctions from Damages?" 30 Journal of Legal Studies 401 (2001) (with R. Cooter).
	"Does Risk to Oneself Increase the Care Owed to Others? Law and Economics in Conflict" 29 Journal of Legal Studies 19 (2000) (with R. Cooter).
	"Liability for Uncertainty: Making Evidential Damage Actionable" 18 Cardozo Law Review 1891 (1997) (with A. Stein).

References

External links
 Research profile
 TAU President’s Office

1956 births
Living people
Academic staff of Tel Aviv University
University of Chicago faculty
Deans of law schools in Israel
Law and economics scholars
Scholars of contract law
Scholars of tort law
Israeli legal scholars
Members of the Israel Academy of Sciences and Humanities
Yale Law School alumni
Presidents of universities in Israel